The 2003 Asian Youth Girls Volleyball Championship was held in Weesommai Gymnasium, Sisaket, Thailand from 20 to 27 April 2003.

Results

|}

|}

Final standing

Awards
MVP:  Wang Yimei
Best Scorer:  Saymai Paladsrichuay
Best Spiker:  Kim Song-ok
Best Blocker:  Betsy Thankachen
Best Server:  Ma Xiaoying
Best Setter:  Kamonporn Sukmak
Best Digger:  Suvipriew Bamrung
Best Receiver:  Sin Yong-sun

External links
 www.asianvolleyball.org
FIVB

A
V
V
Asian women's volleyball championships